WDFB-FM (88.1 FM) is a radio station  broadcasting a Christian radio format. Licensed to Danville, Kentucky, United States.  The station is currently owned by Alum Springs Educational Corporation.

References

External links

DFB-FM
Radio stations established in 1992